John Richard Buckton (born 22 December 1961) is a former English rugby player who played as a centre for Saracens between 1984 and 1996, captaining them in the 1991–1992 season. He won three England caps between 1988 and 1990. He won his first England cap coming on in the final minutes of England v. Australia in 1988 at Twickenham, replacing an injured Will Carling, who was England's captain. The twenty-two year old Carling cemented his position in the England team, holding the captaincy of the squad in the 1991 and 1995 Rugby World Cups; forming a strong center partnership with Simon Halliday and, later, Jeremey Guscott; limiting Buckton to only three England caps.

References 

1961 births
Living people
English rugby union players
Saracens F.C. players
Rugby union centres
England international rugby union players
Yorkshire County RFU players